Ladd Reef (Mandarin ) is a Vietnam-controlled reef in the Spratly group of islands, South China Sea.  China (PRC) and Taiwan (ROC) are also claimants of the reef. Like Spratly Island, Ladd Reef lies to the west of the Philippines-defined "Kalayaan Islands" claim area.

Names
The English name Ladd Reef was coined by Richard Spratly in late March 1843, after Captain Ladd of the ship Austen, who seemed to be the first to have seen the reef. The Chinese name Rìjī Jiāo was coined in 1947 to replace the 1935 name Lādé Jiāo (拉德礁), which was transliterated from the English name Ladd.

Geography

It is entirely submerged during high tide, but there are some stones jutting out of the sea during low tide.

Structures 
The reef is uninhabited but contains a Vietnamese lighthouse (built in 1994) with the inscription Hải đăng đá Lát (literally "Ladd Reef Lighthouse"). The lower portion of the lighthouse consists of quarters for a handful of Vietnamese soldiers and the lighthouse keeper.

Other information
In 1945, towards the end of the Second World War, a Dutch submarine (HNLMS O-19) ran aground on Ladd Reef.

References

External links
Maritime Transparency Initiative Island Tracker

Reefs of the Spratly Islands
Reefs of Vietnam